Edward Ming (December 15, 1857 – May 9, 1936) was a veterinary surgeon and political figure in Ontario. He represented Frontenac—Lennox in the Legislative Assembly of Ontario from 1926 to 1929 as a Liberal member.

He was born in Hastings County, Ontario and, after receiving his degree as veterinary surgeon in 1885, set up practice in Napanee. He was married to Emma Katherine Duckworth and had 2 children. Ming served on the school board and town council for Napanee, serving two years as mayor from 1925 to 1926. He died at the Ottawa Civic Hospital at the age of 81.

References

External links

1936 deaths
1857 births
Ontario Liberal Party MPPs
Mayors of places in Ontario